Tona may refer to:
 Tona, Bangladesh, village in India
 Tona, Spain, municipality in the province of Barcelona, Catalonia, Spain
 Tona, Santander, municipality in Santander, Colombia
 Tona (beer), Nicaragua, Beer
 Tona (name)
 Tona (Canadian rapper), from Toronto
 Tona, Katsuura, Chiba, Japan, a neighborhood of Katsuura City in which Katsuura Station is located
 Ton'a, Japanese poet 
 Titles of Nobility amendment, a proposed US constitutional amendment